The 2012 Indiana Hoosiers men's soccer team was the college's 40th season playing organized men's college soccer.

Background 
In the 2011 season Indiana finished fourth in the conference, and lost in the Big Ten Tournament semifinal to eventual champion Northwestern on penalties. Indiana also entered the NCAA Tournament and lost in the third round to North Carolina.

Roster

Competitions

Preseason

Regular season

Match results 

Home team is listed on the right, away team is listed on the left.

Big Ten Tournament

NCAA Tournament

Statistics

Transfers

See also 
 2012 Big Ten Conference men's soccer season
 2012 Big Ten Conference Men's Soccer Tournament

References 

Indiana Hoosiers
Indiana Hoosiers men's soccer seasons
Indiana Hoosiers
Indiana Hoosiers
NCAA Division I Men's Soccer Tournament-winning seasons
NCAA Division I Men's Soccer Tournament College Cup seasons
Indiana Hoosiers